"Non siamo soli" is a single by Eros Ramazzotti with the Latin singer Ricky Martin, who sang it exclusively in Italian. The song, the first single from the greatest hits of Eros Ramazzotti, e², has a second Spanish-language version, "No Estamos Solos".

Music video
The music video for the song was directed by Wayne Isham and was filmed in Miami Beach, Florida in August 2007. Both, an italian and a Spanish version of the video were shot.

Chart performance
The song topped the Italian chart for eleven consecutive weeks. It also peaked at number two in Spain and number three in Switzerland. The song reached number fifteen in Belgian Wallonia, number thirty-two in Germany and number forty-five in Austria. In the United States, it peaked at number twenty-one on the Hot Latin Songs chart.

Track listing
European CD/digital single 
 "Non siamo soli" – 3:45
 "No Estamos Solos" (Spanish version) – 3:44

European CD maxi-single 
 "Non siamo soli" – 3:45
 "No Estamos Solos" (Spanish version) – 3:44
 "Una Storia Importante" (Remix) – 3:59
 "Non siamo soli" (Video) – 3:45

Charts

Weekly charts

Year-end charts

Certifications and sales

See also
List of number-one hits of 2007 (Italy)

References

2007 singles
Eros Ramazzotti songs
Ricky Martin songs
Music videos directed by Wayne Isham
Number-one singles in Italy
Male vocal duets
Songs written by Eros Ramazzotti
Songs written by Claudio Guidetti
2006 songs